The Cabaret, formerly the American Cabaret Theatre, is one of four professional theatres in Indianapolis, founded January 9, 1988 and located for many years in the Athenæum. It is a cabaret theatre, typically doing only one "book" show a season, which has included Evita, Little Shop of Horrors (with elements from the movie added), and even the spoken play, A Streetcar Named Desire. Most of its productions center on a theme and are assembled with interstitial material by founder and artistic director Claude McNeal. It has primarily used a stock company of actors including Shannon Forsell (who eventually replaced McNeal as artistic director and CEO), Brenda Williams, Jeff Owen, Tim Spradlin, and Gary DeMumbrum. Jane Lynch, Alan Cumming and Leslie Odom Jr. have all performed there.

In 2008, it went to several other locations, including the Connoisseur Room at 127 E Ohio St, The Columbia Club
121 Monument Circle, Suite 516, 401 East Michigan Street, and The Metzger Building at 9th and Pennsylvania, where it has been located since July 10, 2017. According to its website, dated February 1, 00-9, "In the face of a change in leadership and financial pressures due to a national economic recession the American Cabaret Theatre is restructured into The Cabaret.

The Cabaret’s new business model is unveiled, with the goal of being sustainable in the new economic climate while raising the quality of productions and educational programming."

The website currently quotes Wikipedia's definition of cabaret.

References

External links
Official website https://www.thecabaret.org

Culture of Indianapolis
Theatres in Indiana